Tumi Mor Matho Mor is a 2000 Indian Assamese romantic-drama film directed by Zubeen Garg in his directorial debut and produced by Debo Borkotoky. It was released on 25 February 2000 opposite Munin Barua's romantic film Hiya Diya Niya.

Cast
Zubeen Garg as Rishiraj Baruah
Zerifa Wahid as Paahi Baruah 
Prastuti Parashar as Tina
Jatin Bora as Raja
Nipon Goswami as Paahi's father 
Mridula Baruah as Rishiraj's mother 
Chetana Das
Hiranya Deka as Professor 
Pabitra Margherita as Arunabh 
Rajesh Bhuyan

Soundtrack

The music soundtrack of Tumi Mor Matho Mor was composed and penned by Zubeen Garg in his first film as a music director along with his another film Hiya Diya Niya. The vocals were performed by Zubeen Garg, Jonkey Borthakur, Sagarika, Shanta Uzir and Luna Sonowal. The album contains 10 tracks included one bonus track and one hidden track.

References

External links
 

Films set in Assam
2000 films
2000s Assamese-language films